The 1983 Canadian Grand Prix was a Formula One motor race held at Circuit Gilles Villeneuve on 12 June 1983. It was the eighth race of the 1983 Formula One World Championship.

The 70-lap race was won from pole position by Frenchman René Arnoux, driving a Ferrari. American Eddie Cheever finished second in a Renault, with Arnoux's compatriot and teammate Patrick Tambay third. Tambay moved to within three points of Drivers' Championship leader Alain Prost, who finished fifth in the other Renault.

Classification

Qualifying

Race

Championship standings after the race

Drivers' Championship standings

Constructors' Championship standings

References

Canadian Grand Prix
Grand Prix
Canadian Grand Prix
Grand Prix